Foe Killer Creek is a stream located in Fulton County, Georgia

Name 

The name Foe Killer Creek is most likely a derivation of Four Killer Creek.  Four Killer was a Cherokee Native American who lived at the head of the creek, who had killed four enemies in battle.  The naming convention for warriors was common in Cherokee tribes.

References
 

Rivers of Georgia (U.S. state)
Rivers of Fulton County, Georgia